Ángel Luis "Wiso" Malavé Zayas is a Puerto Rican politician and former mayor of Cidra.

Malavé was elected as mayor of Cidra at the 1992 general elections. He was reelected to the position in 1996, 2000, 2004, and 2008.

In 2011, Malavé was accused on 14 charges of lewd conduct against several employees of the municipality. In February of that year, a judge determined there was cause for trial in 11 of the 14 charges. Malavé has maintained his innocence and his wife, Carmen Gloria Ellsworth, has said she supports him. After a lengthy trial he was found guilty of all charges and sentenced to 9 years of house arrest.

In November 2011, the evaluating committee of the New Progressive Party determined that Malavé was unable to run for reelection.

Personal life

Malavé has been married with Carmen Gloria Ellsworth since the 1960s. They have three children together. Before entering politics, Malavé studied pedagogy and worked as a schoolteacher.

References

Living people
New Progressive Party (Puerto Rico) politicians
Mayors of places in Puerto Rico
People from Cidra, Puerto Rico
Puerto Rico politicians convicted of crimes
Year of birth missing (living people)